Grupo Desportivo Estoril Praia, commonly known as Estoril, is a Portuguese sports club from Estoril, Cascais, Lisbon. Founded on 17 May 1939, its football team currently plays in Primeira Liga and hold home games at the Estádio António Coimbra da Mota, with a seating capacity of 8,015. As a sports club, Estoril has departments for football, futsal and basketball.

Since the club's establishment, the senior football team has won nine secondary trophies, with the most recent being the 2011–12 Liga de Honra. As a result, some personnel of the club received awards in relation to their performances in the 2011–12 season, of which include Licá, who won the LPFP Liga de Honra Player of the Year, Vagner, who won the LPFP Liga de Honra Goalkeeper of the Year, and Marco Silva, who won the LPFP Liga de Honra Coach of the Year.

History

Early beginnings
The club was founded on 17 May 1939 as Grupo Desportivo Estoril Plage by, among others, Joaquim Cardim, José Ereia, João Rebelo, Armando Vilar, Ernesto Tomás, and Joaquim Nunes. The club's principal promoter was Fausto Cardoso de Figueiredo, the wealthy owner of the Lisbon-Cascais railway, the English hotels of the city, Paris and the Palace, the bath building, and the Estoril Casino. The team's badge and kit colours were inspired by Estoril's many beaches, considered the best in all of Portugal. The yellow symbolizes the colour of the sun, while the blue symbolizes the colour of the neighbouring Atlantic Ocean.

When the club was initially established it began to play in the Campeonato de Lisboa which was a league competition contested by teams from Lisbon. It also began to compete in the Taça de Portugal. Four years after its establishment, the club has reached the Taça de Portugal final in the 1943–44 season in which they lost to Benfica 8–0 at the Campo das Salésias in Lisbon.

Following that season the club reached for the Primeira Liga in the 1944–45 season where they finished seventh in their very first season in Portugal's top flight division. The next season saw the club play in the 1945–46 Segunda Divisão and the 1945–46 Campeonato de Lisboa. The club remained in the top flight until the 1952–53 Primeira Divisão season where they finished last and were relegated to the Portuguese Second Division.

Decline and revival
The next season saw them begin their football life in the Segunda Divisão. Estoril played in the division for 22 years before gaining promotion to the top flight again. Following the appointment of experienced English manager Jimmy Hagan in 1973 who prior to being appointed as manager of Estoril had managed Benfica to three consecutive league titles in 1970–71, 1971–72 and 1972–73 as well as a Taça de Portugal in the 1971–72 season he helped the club achieve promotion to Primeira Liga. The club's return saw them finish an impressive eighth place in the league as well as a quarter-finalist in the cup competition. The next ten years saw the club remain in a stable position finishing in mid-table positions up until the mid-1980s.

In the late 1980s, the club appointed Fernando Santos as manager. A young coach who had played for the club during his professional career in the 1970s who had retired due to several injuries. He helped the club rebuild itself and improve its players and after three years in charge he helped them gain promotion once again to the top flight at the age of 36. During his time he helped the club establish themselves as a Primeira Liga club up until the 1993–94 season where he left the club for Estrela da Amadora and Estoril in that very season were relegated to the second tier.

Since the departure of Fernando Santos as manager in 1994 the club has been lurking around the Liga de Honra. Since the Liga de Honra's establishment the club has participated in fourteen seasons in that division. In the 1998–99 Liga de Honra season, the club suffered relegation to the third tier of Portuguese football for the first time in their history. Since then the club has suffered several promotions and relegation.

Recent years
At the beginning of the millennium, the club was playing in the Portuguese Second Division. Ulisses Morais took over in 2002 and led the club to back to back promotions leading the club to the top flight. Litos took over for the 2004–05 Primeira Liga season where the club finished seventeenth and were relegated after one season.

In the 2011–12 season, the club was promoted to first division by winning the Liga de Honra five points ahead of second place Moreirense. With new owners and under the management of Marco Silva who halfway through the season took over from Vinícius Eutrópio, the team claimed the second Liga de Honra title in club history. The main players on the title roster were João Coimbra, Licá, Steven Vitória and Vagner.
The 2012–13 season marked the return of the club to the Primeira Liga and saw them finish in an impressive fifth place in the league, from the position of newly promoted, and also qualify for the third qualifying round of Europa League, marking its first presence in the European competitions. Estoril reached Europa League group stages after defeating Hapoel Ramat Gan and Pasching. They finished fourth place in a group against Sevilla, Freiburg and Slovan Liberec, with only three points in three draws against Sevilla and Freiburg (twice). In the 2013–14 season, Estoril finished in fourth place, marking its best performance ever in the Portuguese first division, qualifying directly to Europa League's Group Stage, thanks to Benfica's victory over Rio Ave in the Taça de Portugal.

Stadium

Estoril currently play at the Estádio António Coimbra da Mota which holds a seating capacity of 8,015. The stadium also plays host to Estoril's reserve team home games.

The Swedish national football team used the stadium as a training ground in preparation for UEFA Euro 2004. The stadium has also played host to matches of Portuguese youth team games most notably the Portuguese national under-21 football team.

The stadium has also played host to games involving the Portuguese national rugby union team, most recently being against Ukraine in a 2006 European Nations Cup First Division match and against Uruguay in a 2007 Rugby World Cup repechage qualification match.

European cup history

Players

Current squad

Out on loan

Former players

Honours

Domestic honours
Taça de Portugal
 Runners-up (1): 1943–44

 Liga Portugal 2
 Winners (3): 2003–04, 2011–12, 2020–21

 Portuguese Second Division
 Winners (5): 1941–42, 1943–44, 1945–46, 1974–75, 2002–03

 Liga Intercalar
 Winners (1): 2009–10

 "FPF" Cup 
 Runners-up (1): 1976–77

 AF Lisbon First Division
 Winners (1): 1968–69

Personnel honours
 LPFP Liga de Honra Player of the Year
 2011–12 : Licá

 LPFP Liga de Honra Goalkeeper of the Year
 2011–12 : Vagner

 LPFP Liga de Honra Coach of the Year
 2011–12 : Marco Silva

Coaching staff

Coaching history

 Augusto Silva (1942–45)
 Lippo Hertzka (1946–47)
 János Biri (1947–49)
 Jimmy Hagan (1973–75)
 António Medeiros (1975–77)
 José Torres (1979–81)
 Jimmy Hagan (1981–82)
 Mário Wilson (1983–84)
 António Medeiros (1984)
 Mário Wilson (1984–86)
 António Fidalgo (1986–87)
 Fernando Santos (1987–94)
 Carlos Manuel (1994–96)
 Isidro Beato (1996–98)
 Rui Águas (1998–99)
 Minervino Pietra (1999–00)
 José Rachão (2000–01)
 José Morais (2001–02)
 Ulisses Morais (1 Nov 2002 – 23 August 2004)
 Litos (24 Aug 2004 – 30 June 2005)
 Daúto Faquirá (1 July 2005 – 5 January 2006)
 Marco Paulo (6 Jan 2006 – 27 January 2006)
 Litos (28 Jan 2006 – 24 May 2007)
 Tulipa (28 May 2007 – 24 September 2008)
 Manuel Pinho (interim) (25 September 2008 – 29 September 2008)
 João Carlos Pereira (30 September 2008 – 25 May 2009)
 Hélder Cristóvão (1 July 2009 – 28 September 2009)
 Neca (29 September 2009 – 10 May 2010)
 Vinícius Eutrópio (14 May 2010 – 27 September 2011)
 Marco Silva (28 September 2011 – 12 May 2014)
 José Couceiro (24 May 2014–)

League and cup history

A.  Also participated in the Campeonato de Lisboa.
C.  The Taça de Portugal was not held due to the end of the regional championships. As a result of this, a new format and scheduling scheme was introduced for the competition.
D.  Best league classification finish in the club's history.
E.  The Taça de Portugal was not held due to the Latin Cup being held at the Estádio Nacional.
E.  Due to COVID-19 pandemic in Portugal, LigaPro was cancelled with 10 matches to play.
Last updated: 18 July 2014Div. = Division; 1D = Portuguese League; 2H = Liga de Honra; 2DS/2D = Portuguese Second DivisionPos. = Position; Pl = Match played; W = Win; D = Draw; L = Lost; GS = Goal scored; GA = Goal against; P = Points

References

External links

 
 Club Profile at LPFP 
 Club profile at ZeroZero (archived)

 
Football clubs in Portugal
Association football clubs established in 1939
1939 establishments in Portugal
Primeira Liga clubs
Liga Portugal 2 clubs